Chrysomerophyceae is a monotypic class of photosynthetic heterokont eukaryotes.

Taxonomy
 Class Chrysomerophyceae Cavalier-Smith 1995
 Order Chrysomeridales O'Kelly & Billard ex Preisig
 Family Chrysomeridaceae Bourrelly 1957
 Genus Antarctosaccion Delépine 1970 
 Genus Chrysomeris Carter 1937
 Genus Chrysowaernella Gayral & Lepailleur 1971 ex Gayral & Billard 1977
 Genus Giraudyopsis Dangeard 1965
 Genus Rhamnochrysis R.T.Wilce & Markey
 Genus Tetrasporopsis Lemmermann ex Schmidle

References

External links

Ochrophyta
Heterokont classes
Monotypic SAR supergroup taxa